The 1963 Gillette Cup was an English county cricket tournament, held between 1 May and 7 September 1963. The tournament was won by Sussex.

Knockout stage

Preliminary round

First round

Quarter finals

Semi finals

Final

References

External links 
1963 Gillette Cup  at CricketArchive

Friends Provident Trophy seasons
Cricket season